This is a list of the Croatia national football team results from 2020 to present.

Key 

As per statistical convention in football, matches decided in extra time are counted as wins and losses, while matches decided by penalty shoot-outs are counted as draws.

Results

2020

2021

2022

2023

Record per opponent

Notes

References 

Croatia national football team results
2020s in Croatian sport